Ireland was represented by Cathal Dunne in the Eurovision Song Contest 1979 with the song "Happy Man".

Before Eurovision

National final 
The final was held on 4 February 1979 and was broadcast on RTÉ while being held in Dublin, Ireland and hosted by Mike Murphy. The winner, which was decided by 10 regional juries throughout Ireland, was Cathal Dunne, who previously competed in the 1976 Irish National Final, but came 4th, losing out to Red Hurley who performed the song "When".

At Eurovision
Ireland performed 4th in the startfield and finished 5th with 80 points.

Voting

References

External links
 Irish National Final 1979 - Geocities.com
 Irish National Final 1976 - Geocities.com
 Eurovision : Details : Ireland 1979 - ESC-History.com

1979
Countries in the Eurovision Song Contest 1979
Eurovision
Eurovision